MEG: RVO is a mobile Action-adventure / strategy video game from Skunkwerks Kinetic, a video game company based in Vancouver, British Columbia, Canada.

Gameplay
MEG: RVO incorporates elements of action, strategy, and role-playing games. The player takes the role of an "RVO", a remote vehicle operator hired by Slate Corporation to explore an alternate dimension opened by a new technology known as the "Probability Aperture". The player uses the iPad to control their vehicle from an overhead perspective through large outdoor maps with varied environments.

The player is assisted by a personal "MEG" unit; a quadrupedal robot that acts as the "arms" of the vehicle. Use of the MEG unit allows the player to retrieve artifacts and wreckage found within the game world. MEG is also able to deploy buildings such as a variety of turrets, walls, fences, mines, and beacons. The player can use these buildings to construct bases within the game world that will protect vital locations from enemy AI and other players.

In MEG: RVO, players compete to secure all of the capture points within a particular map. Points are captured for a given team when a member of that team waits upon that point for a certain period of time. The opposing team can then overthrow that point and reclaim it by clearing the surrounding defenses and parking on the point for the same duration of time as the other team. The first team to conquer all of the capture points will be declared the winners of the match. A map stays online as long the map hasn't been conquered by one team.

References

2013 video games
Real-time strategy video games
Action-adventure games
IOS games
IOS-only games
Science fiction video games
Video games developed in Canada